The Travers Solar Project is a photovoltaic power station under construction in Vulcan County, Alberta. After first production in March 2022, it become the largest photovoltaic power station in Canada with a nameplate capacity of 465 MWAC.

The project received a $500 million investment from the Denmark-based investment group Copenhagen Infrastructure Partners in February 2020. Construction began in June 2021. 
As of September 2022, Travers was producing in excess of 360 MWAC of power for the Alberta grid, according to the Alberta Electric System Operator (AESO), in addition to having its planned capacity of 465 MWAC fully installed.

See also
 List of solar farms in Canada

References

Solar power stations in Canada
Power stations in Alberta